Jonas Persson (24 May 1913 – 7 May 1986) was a Swedish cyclist. He competed in the 1000m time trial event at the 1936 Summer Olympics.

References

External links
 

1913 births
1986 deaths
Swedish male cyclists
Olympic cyclists of Sweden
Cyclists at the 1936 Summer Olympics
Sportspeople from Uppsala
20th-century Swedish people